Black Glory is a live album by American jazz pianist Mal Waldron recorded in Munich 1971 and released on the Enja label.

Reception
The AllMusic review by Scott Yanow awarded the album 4 stars stating "Waldron is in excellent form... playing with a knowledge of the avant-garde but still connected to the hard bop tradition".

Track listing
All compositions by Mal Waldron except as indicated
 "M.C." (Jimmy Woode) –  0:35 
 "Sieg Haile" – 17:39 
 "La Glorie du Noir" – 9:43 
 "The Call" – 6:38 
 "Rock My Soul" – 6:36
Recorded at the Domicile in Munich, West Germany on June 29, 1971.

Personnel
 Mal Waldron – piano 
 Jimmy Woode – bass
 Pierre Favre – drums

References

Enja Records live albums
Mal Waldron albums
1971 live albums